GCN may refer to:

Media and society
 Gay Christian Network, now called Q Christian Fellowship, a nonprofit organization and associated social networking site
 Gay Community News (Dublin), Ireland's longest running gay newspaper, published since 1988 by the National Lesbian and Gay Federation
 Gay Community News (Boston), a weekly journal published in Boston from 1973 to 1992
 Genesis Communications Network, a US radio network
 Global Cycling Network, a YouTube channel

Science and technology
 Gamma-ray Burst Coordinates Network
 Graphics Core Next, an AMD graphics microarchitecture series
 Degenerate codon for the amino acid Alanine (A)

Other uses
 Grand Canyon National Park Airport (IATA code)
 GameCube (GCN), a video game console developed by Nintendo.

See also
 General control non-derepressible, proteins such as Gcn2 and Gcn4